Sims is a ghost town in Morton County, North Dakota, United States. The town was founded in 1883, and Sims Scandinavian Lutheran Church was constructed the following year. Today, the church has been restored and still worships every other Sunday. The church parsonage has also been restored and is home to the Sims Historical Society Museum.

During her trip to North Dakota in October 2008, First Lady Laura Bush visited Sims and toured its church.

History
Sims was founded in 1883 as a coal town. Coal mining and the town's brickyard helped Sims grow to a population of more than 1,000 people. However, the 1910 Census recorded a population of just 86 people. The population fluctuated over the years, with an estimated 98 people in 1940.

The post office was founded in 1883 and closed in 1947, with mail routed through Almont, North Dakota, to the south.

Sims Scandinavian Lutheran Church was built in 1884 as a combination church and residence. A new church was built in 1896 next to the parsonage. The church is reportedly North Dakota's oldest Lutheran church west of the Missouri River. The congregation still has roughly 50 members, even though they do not live in Sims. Locals report, however, that the town does have one remaining resident: a former pastor's wife who died between 1916 and 1918. Dubbed the "Gray Lady Ghost," her spirit is reported to haunt the old parsonage, wandering the rooms and playing the organ.

The last residence in Sims, a mobile home in the center of town, was occupied in 2005, but looked vacant by 2010, and was removed by 2012.

References

External links

Ghosttowns.com entry
Information on Sims at Preservation North Dakota

Ghost towns in North Dakota
Geography of Morton County, North Dakota
Former municipalities in North Dakota
Populated places established in 1883
1883 establishments in Dakota Territory
Reportedly haunted locations in North Dakota